Party of Labour Basel (founded in 1944) (in German: Partei der Arbeit Basel (ger. 1944)), a splinter group of Swiss Party of Labour in Basel. PdA 1944 was formed in 1988. It is somewhat more orthodox than the main PdA.

Political parties in Switzerland
Communist parties in Switzerland
Political schisms